George Charles Lee Wilson (1 May 1887 – 14 December 1917) was a New Zealand cricketer who played first-class cricket in the 1913-14 season and died in World War I.

Club career
A short, slightly-built right-arm leg-break and googly bowler who usually opened the bowling, and a useful lower-order batsman, George Wilson played for the Sydenham club in the Canterbury Cricket Association. When they won the championship for the first time in 1912-13, he took 57 wickets at an average of 11.96. In 1913-14 he took 53 wickets at 9.62. He worked in Christchurch as a joiner.

The 1913–14 season
Wilson made his first-class debut on Christmas Day 1913 for Canterbury against Otago at Lancaster Park in Christchurch. Canterbury were the holders of the Plunket Shield, and in the system as it operated at the time, had to defend the title against challengers. Wilson took two wickets in the match, which Canterbury won by six wickets. In the next match, against Wellington, Wilson took 4 for 76 and 7 for 80 in another Canterbury victory, this time by 243 runs. The third match was against Auckland. Batting at number ten in the first innings and nine in the second, Wilson made 34 not out and 64 not out, and took 5 for 73 and 6 for 117. For the final Plunket Shield match of the season Canterbury travelled south to Dunedin to play Otago again. Before the match they played a two-day match in Invercargill against Southland, in which Wilson took 8 for 56 and 5 for 41. Against Otago he took 5 for 95 and 2 for 88 in an innings victory for Canterbury. Wilson was the outstanding bowler in the Plunket Shield season, with 31 wickets at an average of 18.77.

He played two matches against the Australian team that toured New Zealand at the end of the season, but without taking a wicket in either match. The first match was between Canterbury and the Australians, when Victor Trumper and Arthur Sims added 433 runs for the eighth wicket in 190 minutes, a world record for the eighth wicket that still stands. Wilson did not open the bowling this time, and took no wicket for 95 off 19 overs. Trumper hit one of his deliveries "into the frog pond on the back ground, the biggest hit of the match". The Australians then played two matches against New Zealand. Wilson played in the first, but bowled only eight overs for 39 runs, and Australia won by seven wickets. He was one of seven players who lost their place in the team for the second match, which Australia won by an innings.

Death in World War I
   
Wilson served as a private with the Canterbury Infantry Regiment in World War I. He was killed in action at the Ypres salient on 14 December 1917.

References

External links
 
 George Wilson at CricketArchive
 Private Wilson of Christchurch

1887 births
1917 deaths
New Zealand cricketers
Pre-1930 New Zealand representative cricketers
Canterbury cricketers
New Zealand military personnel killed in World War I
New Zealand Military Forces personnel of World War I
New Zealand Army soldiers
Military personnel from Christchurch